Perunilam is a small Village/hamlet in Meenachil  Taluk in Kottayam district of Kerala State, India. It comes under Poonjar Panchayath. It belongs to South Kerala Division . It is located 44 km  East from District headquarters Kottayam. 2.5 km from Erattupetta. 149 km from State capital Thiruvananthapuram. Main agricultural crop is rubber. The popular Christian Pilgrim Centre Bharananganam (St Alphonsa Shrine Church and Pilgrim Centre ) and St. George's Syro-Malabar Catholic Forane Church, Aruvithura  is near to Perunilam.  Perunilam Kurishupally is located in Perunilam. Malayalam is the Local Language here. Kottayam Rail Way Station is major railway station 40 km near to Perunilam.

Nearby cities
Erattupetta, Palai, Kanjirapally, Bharananganam, Aruvithura, Kottayam .

Local tourist attractions
Poonjar dynasty ( Poonjar Palace), Aruvithura Vallyachan Mala, Vengathanam Aruvi (Chennad Malika), Wagamon

References

Villages in Kottayam district